= Rakaskop =

- Village
- Interactive map of Rakaskop
- Coordinates: 15°49′N 74°22′E
- Country: India
- State: Karnataka
- District: Belgaum
- Talukas: Belgaum

Languages
  - Official: Marathi
- Time zone: UTC+5:30 (IST)

Rakaskop is a village in Belgaum district of Karnataka, India.
